SC for Ed, founded in 2018 by Lisa Ellis, is a 501(c)(4) nonprofit political advocacy group in South Carolina.

Overview

Lisa Ellis, founder of the organization, is running for the office of state superintendent of education in the 2022 election as a Democrat. Ellis won the Democratic nomination in the June primary and announced she would take a leave of absence from the group to focus on her campaign. Since 2019, the group has gained notoriety and political strength in South Carolina, garnering the support of a number of state legislators, mostly Democratic. However, Republicans have compromised with SC for Ed's leaders on issues including teacher pay raises. As a 501(c)(4), the group has considered taking steps such as running targeted advertisements.

History

All Out Teacher Rally

On May 1, 2022, over 10,000 educators met at the South Carolina Statehouse to protest various issues related to education, including low teacher pay, high student-to-teacher ratio, and the teacher shortage. Many school districts around the state closed during the protest, with some citing a high number of leave requests, such as personal days, and low numbers of substitutes as reasons for the closures. Some school districts, such as Richland School District 2 later voted to forgive the day missed due to the event.

Organizers of the protest hailed it as a success. The state legislature soon voted to increase teacher pay by 4%, though no legislation directly altered the state of high classroom occupancy and the teacher shortage.

COVID-19

Throughout the COVID-19 pandemic in 2020 and 2021, SC for Ed frequently advocated for the institution of mask mandates in schools, which governor Henry McMaster refused to initiate. Further, the group demanded that schools remain closed more than a year after the outset of the pandemic, at a time during which there was some controversy over the effects of early strains of the virus on children. For example, according to Anthony Fauci, in November 2021, "The spread among children and from children is not really very big at all."  Fauci later amended his statement, saying, in reference to Florida's anti-mask mandate law, "I cannot understand how one can say I'm going to mandate that you don't allow a person to mandate a mask – in other words the anti-mandate mandate. It just doesn't make any sense to me why you would want to not protect the children." An SC for Ed board member stated, "If we do not have mitigation efforts that are effective in place to help with the spread of COVID, such as masks, we are going to see more and more children become ill,”  The group based its position on then-current medical guidance from the American Academy of Pediatrics and Centers for Disease Control and Prevention.

Criticism and Reactions

The group has gained criticism for encouraging teachers to take accrued personal leave days to protest. Although the group itself is politically nonpartisan, critics such as online media outlet FITSNews, have labeled the group as "liberal" or "mob" or "union." Local news outlets such as The State (newspaper) and WIS (TV) have cited data and opinions from the group in explaining issues like the state teacher shortage.

State representative Murrell Smith was caught on a hot mic saying "It’s no fun because every time I do that SC for Ed puts my fat ass on Twitter making motions and they all start feeding on it." An unnamed source who forwarded the "hot mic moment" to FITSNews suggested that Smith should be censured for his comment.

In May 2021, the group stated that they were forced to meet in secret because of numerous death threats made online, including one from an organization that stormed the U.S. Capitol on January 6, 2021. Law enforcement informed the group of some of the threats. SC for ED filed police reports against the people and groups that threatened violence. The group had planned to march at the South Carolina Statehouse and the governor's mansion, but decided to cancel "for the safety of all involved." SC for Ed has opposed legislation by state legislators prohibiting the implementation of what legislators have called Critical race theory and the banning of books related to race-related concepts, including information on its website about the legislation from the NAACP Legal Defense and Educational Fund and others. Others have agreed with SC for Ed that the laws might "might further drive teachers out of the classroom and lead to an incomplete education of topics, such as the Civil War and the civil rights movement."  The NAACP Legal Defense and Educational Fund included the South Carolina "anti-CRT" bills among a list of "Bans on Truth, History and Racial Discourse"  and the South Carolina chapters of the NAACP, American Civil Liberties Union, E3 Foundation, and Lowcountry Black Parents Association all partnered with SC for Ed in opposing the bills, as well.

In the 2022 debate for South Carolina state superintendent of education, Ellen Weaver accused the group for pushing progressive legislation and "pronoun politics," and also said that the group believes that the group believes parents are "domestic terrorists." Weaver defeated Ellis in the general election.

See also
Palmetto State Teachers Association
South Carolina Education Association

References

Lobbying organizations in the United States
Education advocacy groups
Advocacy groups in the United States